Margaret Beauchamp (1404 – 14 June 1467) was the eldest daughter of Richard Beauchamp, 13th Earl of Warwick and his first wife, Elizabeth de Berkeley. As the eldest child of a family without male issue, Margaret was expected to inherit from her father until her stepmother, Isabel le Despenser, gave him a son.

Ancestry 
She was the granddaughter and heir-general of Thomas de Berkeley, 5th Baron Berkeley; however, the Barony and castle of Berkeley had passed to his nephew James Berkeley, 1st Baron Berkeley on his death in 1417. These lands were also claimed by her mother, to whom she and her two sisters were coheirs.
 
Her paternal grandfather was Thomas de Beauchamp, 12th Earl of Warwick, who fought for John of Gaunt in Spain and imprisoned in the Tower of London by Richard II and pardoned by Henry IV. However he died 3 years before Margaret was born.

Marriage 

On 6 September 1425 she had married John Talbot, 1st Earl of Shrewsbury; he and her two brothers-in-law, the Duke of Somerset and the Baron Latimer, vigorously maintained the claim to the Berkeley lands. However, Latimer's claim was possessed by his brother, the Earl of Salisbury, as Latimer had been declared insane.

By Talbot, she had five children:

John Talbot, 1st Viscount Lisle (1426 – 17 July 1453)
Sir Louis Talbot (c. 1429)
Sir Humphrey Talbot (before 1434 – c. 1492)
Lady Eleanor Talbot (c. February/March 1436 – 30 June 1468), married to Sir Thomas Butler and alleged mistress to King Edward IV.
Lady Elizabeth Talbot (c. December 1442/January 1443 – 6 November 1506/10 May 1507), married to John de Mowbray, 4th Duke of Norfolk. 

Lord and Lady Talbot were distantly related to each other, having a shared ancestor in King Edward I and both being descendants of the houses of Clare and Despenser. She received the title of Countess of Clermont through the bravery of her husband during the wars with France.

Wars of the Roses 
During the troubled years of the Wars of the Roses, the dispute frequently passed from litigation to actual violence.

Lord Berkeley sacked Margaret's manor at Wotton-under-Edge in Gloucestershire, in return for which her son, the Viscount Lisle, stormed Berkeley Castle (1452) and took him prisoner. 

Margaret also succeeded in having Lord Berkeley's wife, Lady Isabel Mowbray, committed to prison, where she died that year.

Litigation from her deathbed 

Lord Berkeley married Lady Joan Talbot, Margaret's stepdaughter, in 1457, temporarily quelling the feud. It broke out again in 1463, when William Berkeley, 2nd Baron Berkeley, acceded. Litigation continued, and on her death in 1467, she left her claims to her grandson Thomas Talbot, 2nd Viscount Lisle. She was buried in St Faith under St Paul's at London.

Ancestry

Notes

References
 Camden, William. "Of the Antiquity of Epitaphs in England." A Collection of Curious Discourses. Vol. 1, Ed. Thomas Hearne, Benjamin White, at Horace's Head, London, 1775.

1404 births
1467 deaths
15th-century English women
15th-century English people
Shrewsbury
Daughters of British earls
Wives of knights
Margaret